is a district located in Fukushima Prefecture, Japan.

As of 2008, the district has an estimated population of 39,633 and a density of 190 persons per km2. The total area is 208.53 km2.

Towns and villages
Kawamata
Koori
Kunimi

Mergers
On January 1, 2006 the towns of Date, Hobara, Ryōzen, Tsukidate and Yanagawa merged to create the city of Date.
On July 1, 2008 the town of Iino was annexed by the city of Fukushima (excluding Kawamata).

See also
Date clan

Districts in Fukushima Prefecture
District Date